Zławieś Mała  is a village in the administrative district of Gmina Zławieś Wielka, within Toruń County, Kuyavian-Pomeranian Voivodeship, in north-central Poland.

History

During the German occupation of Poland (World War II), Zławieś Mała was one of the sites of executions of Poles, carried out by the Germans in 1939 as part of the Intelligenzaktion.

Transport
The Voivodeship road 546 passes through the village, and the Polish National road 80 runs nearby, south of the village.

References

Villages in Toruń County